Shaldimar Daantji (born 4 May 1984 in Rotterdam) is a Dutch baseball player who played for the Netherlands national baseball team at the 2011 Baseball World Cup.

References

External links
 www.honkbalsite.com baseball profile

Dutch baseball players
Sportspeople from Rotterdam
Dutch people of Curaçao descent
1984 births
Living people
DOOR Neptunus players
Curacao Neptunus players
Sparta-Feyenoord players
L&D Amsterdam Pirates players